The 1927 European Figure Skating Championships were held in Vienna, Austria. Elite senior-level figure skaters from European ISU member nations competed for the title of European Champion in the discipline of men's singles.

Results

Men

References

External links
 results

European Figure Skating Championships, 1927
European Figure Skating Championships, 1927
European Figure Skating Championships
International figure skating competitions hosted by Austria